d'Inverno is a surname and may be:

 Mark d'Inverno, British computer scientist
 Ray d'Inverno, computer scientist
 Brigadier JG d'Inverno, Scottish Judge and the senior Army Reserves Officer in Scotland.
d'Inverno means "of winter" in Italian.

See also 
 Giardino d'Inverno ("Winter Garden") at the Orto botanico di Palermo
 Vacanze d'inverno ("Winter Holidays"), a 1959 Italian comedy film
 Se una notte d'inverno un viaggiatore ("If on a winter's night a traveler"), a 1979 novel by Italo Calvino
 Lua d'Inverno, a track on Wolfheart, the first album by Moonspell in 1995